Peter Gregory Obi  (born 19 July 1961) is a Nigerian businessman and politician who served as governor of Anambra from March to November 2006, February to May 2007, and June 2007 to March 2014. In May 2022, he became the Labour Party candidate for President of Nigeria in the 2023 presidential election, after defecting from the Peoples Democratic Party. 

Born in Onitsha in 1961, Obi graduated from the University of Nigeria in 1984. Afterwards he entered business and banking, eventually holding several executive positions at banks. Obi ran for governor in 2003 as a member of the All Progressives Grand Alliance, but Chris Ngige was declared winner of the election. In 2006, the election of Chris Ngige was nullified and  Obi was declared winner of the 2003 election, and he assumed office in March 2006. He was impeached in November the same year by the Anambra State House of Assembly, led by Hon. Mike Balonwu, but his impeachment was overturned and he returned to office in February 2007. Obi was removed after the 2007 Anambra State gubernatorial election, but the judiciary again intervened by ruling that he should be allowed to complete a full four-year term. In 2010, he was re-elected to a second term. 

After leaving office in 2014, Obi decamped to the Peoples Democratic Party. In 2019, he was selected as the PDP vice presidential nominee in the presidential election running alongside Atiku Abubakar but the ticket lost to incumbent president Muhammadu Buhari and vice president Yemi Osinbajo. In 2022, Obi ran for president himself, first in the PDP until defecting to the LP in May 2022 to obtain its nomination. Obi's presidential campaign has been described as populist and has been noted for its support among many young Nigerians, who have been nicknamed "Obidients".

Early life and education
Peter Obi was born on 19 July 1961 in Onitsha, Anambra State, in a devout Christian family. He attended Christ the King College, Onitsha, where he completed his secondary school education. He was admitted to the University of Nigeria, in 1980 and graduated with a B.A. (Hons) in philosophy in 1984.

Business career 
Obi was a businessman before he ventured into politics. He held leadership positions in some private establishments.

Some of the companies he served include:
Next International Nigeria Ltd, Chairman and Director of Guardian Express Mortgage Bank Ltd, Guardian Express Bank Plc, Future View Securities Ltd, Paymaster Nigeria Ltd, Chams Nigeria Ltd, Data Corp Ltd and Card Centre Ltd. He was the youngest chairman of Fidelity Bank Plc.

Gubernatorial tenure and vice presidential candidacy

First term
Peter Obi contested in the Anambra State Governorship Election as a candidate for the All Progressives Grand Alliance (APGA) party in 2003; but his opponent, Chris Ngige of the People's Democratic Party, was declared winner by the Independent National Electoral Commission (INEC).

After nearly three years of litigation, Ngige's victory was overturned by the Court of Appeal on 15 March 2006. 
Obi took office for governorship on 17 March 2006. On 2 November 2006, he was impeached by the Anambra State House of Assembly, led by Hon. Mike Balonwu, after seven months in office and was replaced the next day by Virginia Etiaba, his deputy, making her the first-ever female governor in Nigeria's history. 
Obi successfully challenged his impeachment and was re-instated as the governor on 9 February 2007 by the Court of Appeal sitting in Enugu. Etiaba handed power back to him after the court ruling.

Peter Obi once again left office on 29 May 2007 following the General Elections, in which Andy Uba was declared the winner by the electoral body. 
Obi returned to the courts once more, this time contending that the four-year tenure he had won in the 2003 elections only started to run when he took office in March 2006. On 14 June 2007 the Supreme Court of Nigeria upheld Obi's contention and returned Obi to office. This brought to an abrupt end the tenure of Obi's successor, Andy Uba whose 14 April 2007 election the Supreme Court nullified on the grounds that Obi's four-year tenure should have remained undisturbed until March 2010.

Second term

On 7 February 2010, the Independent National Electoral Commission (INEC) declared Peter Obi the winner of the 2010 Anambra State Gubernatorial election. He defeated Professor Charles Chukwuma Soludo, former governor, CBN. This election victory gave Governor Obi an additional four years as the governor of Anambra State.

On 17 March 2014 Peter Obi served out his second term and handed over the governorship to Willie Obiano. After leaving office in 2014, Obi gained new status as an advocate for good governance and national political figure after decamping to the Peoples Democratic Party in 2014.

After the 2015 General Election, President Goodluck Jonathan appointed Peter Obi as the chairman of the Nigerian Security and Exchange Commission (SEC).

2019 presidential elections
On 12 October 2018, Peter Obi was named as the running mate to Atiku Abubakar, the Peoples Democratic Party's Presidential Candidate in the 2019 presidential election. As a candidate for Vice President, Obi opposed proposals for a standardized national minimum wage, arguing that different states should have different minimum wages. The Abubakar/Obi ticket came second.

2023 presidential candidacy 

On 24 March 2022, Peter Obi declared his intention to run for the position of President of Nigeria under the platform of the Peoples Democratic Party, but later pulled out and announced he would be running under the Labour Party platform instead. According to the Peoples Gazette, Peter Obi wrote to the leadership of the Peoples Democratic Party on 24 May to resign his membership. Obi reportedly complained of massive bribing of delegates and vote buying at party's presidential primary, citing the existence of a party clique collaborating against him.

Obi's business background and status as a major candidate not affiliated with either of Nigeria's two main parties has drawn comparisons with Emmanuel Macron's successful 2017 French presidential candidacy. Obi has expressed admiration for Macron and was among the officials who received Macron during his visit to Lagos.

Obidient Movement 
Younger generations under 30 proved to be some of the biggest Obi's supporters, showing their support via social media and protests and street marches. Aisha Yesufu, a prominent activist noted as the cofounder of the #BringBackOurGirls movement and a supporter of the End SARS campaign, endorsed Obi in her first-ever endorsement of a presidential candidate.

Young supporters of Obi's campaign have been nicknamed "Obidients".  In an article in Business Day, it was argued that:"[The Obi-Dients] are attracted by Peter Obi's ideology of frugality, economic production rather than the ostentatious consumerism and waste, and resourceful management and investment in key sectors, for economic growth and development."Commentators have argued that Obi's third party candidacy appeals to young voters dissatisfied with the two major parties, which has resulted in the "biggest political movement in recent Nigerian history." With his core message of prudence and accountability, Obi has managed to gain the backing of voters for his previously largely unknown Labour Party into a strong third force against two political heavyweights. Before campaigns were officially kicked off, Obi's supporters held a series of One Million Man Marches in several Nigerian cities including Makurdi, Calabar, Lafia, Port Harcourt, Afikpo, Owerri, Enugu, Auchi, Abuja, Kano, Ilorin, Abakaliki and Ibadan. The marches were not part of the official campaigns; as they were led by volunteer Obi supporters and not Obi's in-house team or political party. The marches experienced massive turnouts.

Dr. Obiageli Ezekwesili, a former Minister of Education in Nigeria in an interview with Channels Television said that Nigerian women are more inclined toward the presidency of Peter Obi.

Selection of running mate 
Physician Doyin Okupe initially served as the temporary running mate of Obi until a substantive candidate could be selected. In the run-up to the final selection of a running mate, media outlets reported that there was an effort to have former Senator Shehu Sani of Kaduna State serve as Obi's running mate.

On 8 July 2022, Obi unveiled his running mate, Senator Yusuf Datti Baba-Ahmed. Speaking on his choice of the vice presidential candidate, he stated as follows: "This is our right to secure, unite and make Nigeria productive. And you can't do that without having people who have similar visions, ideas and are prepared for the task. So, I have the honour today to present to you, God willing, Nigeria's next vice president in the person of Senator Yusuf Datti Baba-Ahmed."

Election results 
The results were announced on 1 March 2023. Bola Tinubu of the All Progressives Congress party, was named the president-elect with 8.79 million votes. Obi received 6.1 million votes, and won in both Lagos and Abuja. This put Obi in third place behind winner Bola Tinubu and People's Democratic Party nominee Atiku Abubakar. Due to the elections being rife with several allegations, reports and evidence of voter manipulation, disenfranchisement and rigging, Obi announced at his press conference that he would challenge the election results, stating that, "We won the election and we will prove it to Nigerians" .

Political positions

National security 
As a candidate, Obi has publicly demanded that the federal government name individuals responsible for financing terrorism and oil theft in Nigeria. In 2020, Obi expressed support for the End SARS social movement against police brutality.

Women's issues 
Obi has stated that he believes women are less prone to corruption in public office than men, and states that his gubernatorial staff were predominantly women. Obi has said he wants to do away with the Office of the First Lady of Nigeria, stating “It was not my wife that was voted in but himself. The Ministry of Women Affairs was enough to take good care of women.” In commemoration of International African Women's Day, Obi stated: "In Nigeria, we advocate continually greater women participation in leadership, nation-building and society, which begins with unfettered social inclusion, gender mainstreaming and empowerment."

Awards and honours
These are some of the notable awards of Peter Obi:

  The Suns Man of the Year (2007)
 This Days Most Prudent Governor in Nigeria (2009)
 Bill & Melinda Gates Foundation's Best Performing Governor on Immunization in South-East Nigeria (2012)
 Silverbird's Man of the Year (2013)
 Distinguished Alumnus Award - Lagos Business School Alumni Association (LBSAA) (2014)
 Nigerian Library Association's Golden Merit Award (2014)
 Pontifical Equestrian Order of Saint Sylvester Pope and Martyr (2014)
 Roman Catholic Archdiocese of Onitsha's Golden Jubilee Award (2015)
 This Days Governor of the Decade (2020)
 Leadership Excellence Award's Man of the Year (2022)

Pandora Papers

The result of the Pandora Papers leaks, the Premium Times reported on Obi's involvement in offshore companies in tax havens such as the British Virgin Islands and Barbados. Obi appeared to have made shell companies in the 1990s with the Barbados-based Beauchamp Investments Limited and UK-based Next International (UK) Limited being tied back to Obi and his family. This was before he held any political office in Nigeria. 
Further reporting showed that in 2010 as well, Obi had Access International help him set up and manage Gabriella Investments Limited, a company in the British Virgin Islands named after Obi's daughter. One of the directors was also the director of a Belize-based shell company that was issued 50,000 shares in Gabriella Investments.
In 2017, Obi reorganized the company under the name PMGG Investments Limited and created a trust named The Gabriella Settlement which became the sole shareholder in PMGG Investments Limited. Obi was not holding any political position at this time.

According to the Premium Times report which claimed that Obi had broken several laws due to his business dealings. The report claimed that firstly, Obi remained as director of Next International (UK) Limited while serving as Governor of Anambra State, which is in direct violation of Code of Conduct Bureau and Tribunal Act. However Obi described that claim to be misleading and wrong in an interview with Arise News stating that he resigned from all companies before taking the office of Governor of Anambra State. Secondly, it claimed that Obi's non-declaration of his offshore companies broke the Nigerian Constitution's provision that require public officers to declare all their properties, assets, and liabilities.

A few days after the report, Obi responded by claiming that he did not break any laws and clarified that the accounts' money was accrued from his time as a businessman. The EFCC invited him for questioning later in October 2021 after Buhari directed all anti-corruption agencies to investigate those named in the leaks. However, no criminal case has ever been filed against Obi.

Personal life 
Peter Obi is a practicing Catholic. He married Margaret Brownson Obi (née Usen) in 1992 and they have two children.

See also
List of governors of Anambra State
List of Igbo people

References

1961 births
Living people
Nigerian Roman Catholics
Governors of Anambra State
People from Anambra State
Igbo politicians
Igbo people
Candidates for President of Nigeria
People named in the Pandora Papers
Impeached governors
Christ the King College, Onitsha alumni
University of Nigeria alumni
Harvard Business School alumni
Columbia Business School alumni
Lagos Business School alumni
Nigerian politicians
Nigerian political candidates
Alumni of the London School of Economics